The Visitation is the debut studio album by American rock band Chrome. It was released in 1976 by Siren Records. In 2014, the album was re-released by Cleopatra Records with additional bonus tracks.

Background 
Unlike Chrome's later albums, The Visitation is in a psychedelic vein with progressive rock leanings. AllMusic described its style as "early Brian Eno meets Santana".

Track listing

Personnel 

 Chrome

 Damon Edge – drums, synthesizer, backing vocals, production, sleeve design
 John Lambdin – guitar, bass guitar, mandolin, strings, synthesizer, electric violin, backing vocals
 Mike Low – lead vocals, bass guitar, guitar, synthesizer, backing vocals
 Gary Spain – bass guitar, keyboards, acoustic and electric violins

 Technical

 Amy James – sleeve photography

References

External links 

 

1976 debut albums
Chrome (band) albums